Morabaraba is a traditional two-player strategy board game played in South Africa and Botswana with a slightly different variation played in Lesotho. The game is known by many names in many languages, including mlabalaba, mmela (in Setswana), muravava, and umlabalaba. The game is similar to twelve men's morris, a variation on the Roman board game nine men's morris.

While some believe that morabaraba was introduced to Southern Africa by British settlers, morris variants exist in many parts of the world, e.g., India (char bhar), Ghana (achi), Kenya (shisimia), Somalia (shax), Zimbabwe (tsoro yemutwelve),Iran(dooz), the Philippines (tapatan) and Mongolia (gurgaldaj). It is claimed that morabaraba boards carved in rock are dated to be at least 800 years old, which would exclude a European origin. However, many rock art images do not actually show morabaraba, but the mancala-type game of moruba (using  of cupules).

Morabaraba is today most popular amongst rural African youth in Southern Africa. In the traditional European games like nine men's morris, the counters are commonly referred to as "men", but in the South African game the counters are referred to as "cows", the game being particularly popular amongst youth who herd cattle.

According to the OxfordDictionaries.com, the term morabaraba is derived from the Southern Sotho moraba-raba, meaning 'to mill' or 'to go round in a circle'.

Gameplay
Morabaraba is accessible and easy to learn, and games can be played quickly, but the strategic and tactical aspects of the game run deep. While it may be played on specially produced boards (or simulated by computer software as a video game), it is simple enough that a board can easily be scratched on a stone or into sand, with coins or pebbles (or whatever comes to hand) used as the pieces. The description below is compatible with Mind Sports South Africa's "generally accepted rules".

There are three main phases to the game:

 Placing the cows
 Moving the cows
 Flying the cows

Placing the cows
 The board is empty when the game begins. Each player has 12 pieces, known as "cows"; one player has light cows and the other has dark cows
 The player with the dark cows moves first
 Each turn consists of placing a cow on an empty intersection on the board
 The aim is to create a "mill": a row of three cows on any line drawn on the board
 If a player forms a mill, he or she may remove or "shoot" one of the opponent's cows. The shot cow is removed from the board and not placed again. A cow in a mill may not be shot unless all of the opponent's cows are in mills, in which case any cow may be shot.
 Even if a move creates more than one mill, only one cow can be shot in a single move

Moving the cows
 After all the cows have been placed, each turn consists of moving a cow to an empty adjacent intersection
 As before, completing a mill allows a player to shoot one of the opponent's cows. Again, this must be a cow which is not in a mill, unless all of the opponent's cows are in mills.
 Players are allowed to "break" their own mills
 A mill may be broken and remade repeatedly by shuffling cows back and forth. Each time the mill is remade, one of the opponent's cows is shot. Of course, by breaking the mill the player exposes the cows which were in a mill to the risk of being shot by the opponent on his or her next turn.
 In the "generally accepted rules" published by Mind Sports South Africa, a mill which is broken to form a new mill can not be formed again on the next move.
 In some instances (in a competitive game) a chess rule "touch is a move" apply for time management. But this rule will be applied depending on the opinion of players.

Flying the cows
 When a player has only three cows remaining, desperate measures are called for. This player's cows are allowed to "fly" to any empty intersection, not just adjacent ones.
 If one player has three cows and the other player has more than three cows, only the player with three cows is allowed to fly

Finishing the game
 A win occurs if one opponent has just two cows or if there are no moves. 
 If either player has only three cows and neither player shoots a cow within ten moves, the game is drawn
 If one person cheats, then the other one wins by default
 If one player picks up all cows while the play is still on, the player whose cows are on the board wins by default.
 If a player plays twice before the other player, the player who did not play wins by default.

Morabaraba as sport
Currently the International Wargames Federation is the international governing body for the game as a competitive sport, and Mind Sports South Africa (MSSA) is the South African governing body. MSSA is recognised by both the South African Department of Sports and Recreation and the South African Sports Confederation and Olympic Committee (SASCOC) .

MSSA has developed amateur leagues, using different regional versions of the game, throughout the country, and has adopted a notation scoring system similar to that for nine men's morris.

The game is an official discipline of the Traditional World Games, which are held every five years. Tournaments were not just in South Africa, but also in Bangkok (Thailand), Melbourne (Australia), New Orleans (United States), Athens (Greece), and at the Epsom College in England.

World Championships
Since 1997, Morabaraba World Championships have been held, in three divisions: senior (i.e. adult males), women, and junior (boys and girls).  Divisional winners are shown in the table below.

Variations

Sesotho board
This is the variation typically played by Sesotho-speakers in South Africa and Lesotho. It differs from the standard form in that the board does not have diagonals between  the center points of its sides and there is an additional intersection in the center of the board to prevent a draw.

Eleven men's morris
This is a European variation that uses the same board as morabaraba but is played with eleven counters. This prevents a situation where the game can end in a draw in the placement phase.

Standard notation
The standard Welt–Mühlespiel–Dachverband notation for nine men's morris works well for morabaraba . It is very similar to algebraic notation in chess. The board is laid out on a grid, with the columns in the grid being labelled a–g (from left to right), and rows in the grid being labelled from 1–7 (bottom to top). Each point is then referred to by its coordinate; for example, the top-left point in the middle (not inner) square is labelled b6. Moves are then formatted as in chess or draughts: placing a piece is denoted simply by the square where it is placed; moving a piece by the from and to squares (e.g. c5-d5); capturing by appending the captured piece to the move (e.g., c5-b6xe5 or c4xa1).

References

Davie, K.; The Little Golden Rhino. Stellenbosch, South Africa: Peace Parks Foundation; 4 April 2004.
Dunton, C.; Ntaote, B; Bulane, N.; A Game for Two: Morabaraba"; Sethlala, Lesotho; March/April 1990; pp. 30–31. 
Futhwa, F.; Setho: Afrikan Thought and Belief System; Alberton, South Africa: Nalane ka Fezekile Futhwa; 2011; p. 95
Hamann, H.; "Herdboys' Game Moves into the Big Time", The Sunday Times; South Africa; 13 February 2000
Hess, S.; "Playing the African Game", 1999 Guide to South African Arts, Culture and Heritage; 1999.
Lehihi, M.; "The African Game", The Sunday Times; South Africa; 6 April 2003.
Mathys, C.; "Kids Learn to Be Game for Traditional Sports", Cape Argus Independent News and Media; 26 April 2005.
Mosimege, M. D.; Exploration of the Games of Malepa and Morabaraba in South African Secondary School Mathematics Education; Cape Town, South Africa: University of the Western Cape; 2000.  
Nkopodi, N.; Mosimege M. S.; "Incorporating the Indigenous Game of Morabaraba in the Learning of Mathematics", South African Journal of Education 29(3); 2009; pp. 377–392. 
Russouw, S.; "Getting Morabaraba back on Board", Johannesburg News Agency; 20 September 2002.
Thokozile Mkonto, K.; Indigenous Games Rule Book. Sport Recreation South Africa, Pretoria, South Africa; 2006; pp. 22–23.

External links
 Mindsports South Africa – the South African National controlling body for Morabaraba
 Generally Accepted Rules for the game of Morabaraba
 Printable Morabaraba or Twelve Men's Morris board https://sites.google.com/view/cavegames-morabaraba/home
African games
Morris games